Pink Palace may refer to:

United States
 Jayne Mansfield's Pink Palace, Los Angeles, California
 363 Copa De Oro Road, Los Angeles, California
 Don CeSar, a hotel in St. Petersburg Beach, Florida
 Royal Hawaiian Hotel, Honolulu, Hawaii
 A house in Louisville, Kentucky; see 
 Pink Palace Museum and Planetarium, Memphis, Tennessee	
 Lake Stevens High School, in Lake Stevens, Washington
 Pink Palace (Washington, D.C.), a house listed on the National Register of Historic Places in Washington, D.C.

Other places
 A 1970s–1980s nightclub in present-day Victoria Park Golf Clubhouse, Brisbane, Australia
 Ahsan Manzil, a palace in central Dhaka, Bangladesh
 Ontario Legislative Building, Toronto, Ontario, Canada
 Hawa Mahal, a palace in Jaipur, India